The following is a list providing an overview of sovereign states around the world with information on their status and recognition of their sovereignty.

The 206 listed states can be divided into three categories based on membership within the United Nations System: 193 UN member states, 2 UN General Assembly non-member observer states, and 11 other states. The sovereignty dispute column indicates states having undisputed sovereignty (188 states, of which there are 187 UN member states and 1 UN General Assembly non-member observer state), states having disputed sovereignty (16 states, of which there are 6 UN member states, 1 UN General Assembly non-member observer state, and 9 de facto states), and states having a special political status (2 states, both in free association with New Zealand).

Compiling a list such as this can be a complicated and controversial process, as there is no definition that is binding on all the members of the community of nations concerning the criteria for statehood. For more information on the criteria used to determine the contents of this list, please see the criteria for inclusion section below. The list is intended to include entities that have been recognized as having de facto status as sovereign states, and inclusion should not be seen as an endorsement of any specific claim to statehood in legal terms.

Criteria for inclusion 

The dominant customary international law standard of statehood is the declarative theory of statehood, which was codified by the Montevideo Convention of 1933. The Convention defines the state as a person of international law if it "possess[es] the following qualifications: (a) a permanent population; (b) a defined territory; (c) government; and (d) a capacity to enter into relations with the other states" so long as it was not "obtained by force whether this consists in the employment of arms, in threatening diplomatic representations, or in any other effective coercive measure".

Debate exists on the degree to which recognition should be included as a criterion of statehood. The declarative theory of statehood argues that statehood is purely objective and recognition of a state by other states is irrelevant. On the other end of the spectrum, the constitutive theory of statehood defines a state as a person under international law only if it is recognized as sovereign by other states. For the purposes of this list, included are all polities that consider themselves sovereign states (through a declaration of independence or some other means) and either:
 are often regarded as satisfying the declarative theory of statehood, or
 are recognized as a sovereign state by at least one UN member state

Note that in some cases, there is a divergence of opinion over the interpretation of the first point, and whether an entity satisfies it is disputed. Unique political entities which fail to meet the classification of a sovereign state are considered proto-states.

On the basis of the above criteria, this list includes the following 206 entities:
 203 states recognized by at least one UN member state
 2 states that satisfy the declarative theory of statehood and are recognized only by non-UN member states
 1 state that satisfies the declarative theory of statehood and is not recognized by any other state

The table includes bullets in the right-hand column representing entities that are either not sovereign states or have a close association to another sovereign state. It also includes subnational areas where the sovereignty of the titular state is limited by an international agreement. Taken together, these include:
 Entities that are in a free association relationship with another state
 2 entities controlled by Pakistan which are neither sovereign states, dependent territories, nor part of another state: Azad Kashmir and Gilgit-Baltistan
 Dependent territories of another state, as well as areas that exhibit many characteristics of dependent territories according to the dependent territory page
 Subnational entities created by international agreements

List of states 

"Membership within the UN System" column legend

"Sovereignty dispute" column legend

See also 

 Armorial of sovereign states
 Gallery of sovereign state flags
 ISO 3166-1
 List of adjectival and demonymic forms for countries and nations
 List of administrative divisions by country
 List of associated states
 List of condominiums
 List of countries and inhabited areas
 List of countries and dependencies and their capitals in native languages
 List of countries and dependencies by area
 List of countries and dependencies by population
 List of countries by United Nations geoscheme
 List of country-name etymologies
 List of dependent territories
 List of international rankings
 List of ISO 3166 country codes
 List of micronations
 List of national capitals
 List of rebel groups that control territory
 List of states with limited recognition
 List of territorial disputes
 List of territories governed by the United Nations
 Lists of political entities by century
 Lists of state leaders by century
 Member states of the United Nations
 Sovereign state
 List of former sovereign states
 List of sovereign states and dependent territories by continent
 List of sovereign states by date of formation
 Template:Clickable world map
 Terra nullius
 United Nations list of non-self-governing territories

Notes

References

Bibliography 
 
 
 
 
 
 
 
 
 

Sovereign states
Eurasia
Africa
Americas
Oceania
Countries